Deyman Andrés Cortés Herrera (born 29 July 2000) is a Colombian footballer who plays as a forward.

Career statistics

Club

Notes

References

2000 births
Living people
Colombian footballers
Colombia youth international footballers
Association football forwards
Atlético Huila footballers
Categoría Primera A players
People from Rionegro
Sportspeople from Antioquia Department
21st-century Colombian people